"Born on the Bayou" (1969) is the first track on Creedence Clearwater Revival's second album, Bayou Country, released in 1969. It was released as the B-side of the single "Proud Mary" that reached No. 2 on the Billboard charts.  The song was covered by Little Richard.

Background 
Songwriter John Fogerty set the song in the South, despite neither having lived nor widely traveled there. He commented:

"Born on the Bayou" is an example of "swamp rock", a genre associated with Fogerty, Little Feat/Lowell George, the Band, J.J. Cale and Tony Joe White. The guitar setting for the intro is over-driven with amp tremolo on a slow setting; Fogerty uses a Gibson ES-175 (which was stolen from his car soon after recording this track).

Creedence Clearwater Revival drummer Doug Clifford has said of the song in 1998:

According to Clifford, "Born on the Bayou" was originally supposed to be released as the A-side of the single with "Proud Mary."  Clifford said of the song "I didn’t think 'Proud Mary' was that good, if you want to know the truth about it. I just didn’t like it. I liked 'Born on the Bayou' — to this day, it’s still my favorite Creedence song. It’s nasty, and I was disappointed when [the single] got flipped."  Clifford added that “I must say I’ve had a change of heart over 40 years, and I love ‘Proud Mary.”

Creedence Clearwater Revival performed the song at Woodstock.

Reception
Ultimate Classic Rock critic Cliff M. Junior rated "Born on the Bayou" as Creedence Clearwater Revival's 2nd greatest song, saying that "John Fogerty doesn’t just sing this ominous ode to the New Orleans area — he howls it."

References

Creedence Clearwater Revival songs
1968 songs
Songs written by John Fogerty
Swamp rock songs
Etta James songs
Song recordings produced by John Fogerty
Fantasy Records singles
Southern United States in fiction